Dot and the Kangaroo is a 1977 Australian musical live action/animated film which combines animation and live-action. It is based on the 1899 children's literature book Dot and the Kangaroo by Ethel Pedley.

Plot
New South Wales, 1884: when a redheaded five-year-old girl named Dot finds herself lost in the Australian bush, a female red kangaroo who has lost her joey promises to help the girl find her way home.  In the process, the kangaroo introduces Dot to a number of other local animals, teaching her a greater appreciation for nature.

Cast
Barbara Frawley as Dot
Joan Bruce as the Kangaroo and Dot's Mother
Spike Milligan as Mr. Platypus
June Salter as Mrs. Platypus  
Ross Higgins as Willie Wagtail 
Ron Haddrick as Dot's Father
Lola Brooks
Peter Gwynne
Richard Meikle as Jack the Farmhand

Production
Yoram and Sandra Gross wanted to make an Australian animated feature for the world market. They read a series of books before deciding on Dot and the Kangaroo. Two thirds of the budget was provided by the Australian Film Commission.

The film's backdrop was filmed on location in and around Jenolan Caves and the  Warragamba Dam Catchment Area of the Blue Mountains in New South Wales, Australia. Although the film uses many of the same elements as other animated children's musicals involving animals, such as many of the Disney animated features from the U.S., the film is essentially Australian in its use of icons and accents. It also references Indigenous Australian culture in some scenes which depict animation of cave paintings and aboriginal dancing.

Soundtrack
The film featured an original soundtrack including several lyrical melodies composed by Bob Young with lyrics John Palmer, and Marion Von Alderstein, while Bob Young provided additional lyrics, and they were recorded by Maurie Wilmore. A soundtrack album was released in the year of 1982 combined with the soundtrack of Around the World with Dot. The music from Dot and the Kangaroo appears on the B-side.

Reception
The film was a success, being screened around the world and returning its cost within three years. It allowed Yoram Gross to enlarge his production company and market his family films in the U.S. Additionally, the film's use of animation set against photographic backgrounds established the style for many of his later films.

Release
In the 1980s, the first eight films were released on VHS in the U.S., the first one by Magnetic Video, the next two by CBS/Fox Video and the next five by Family Home Entertainment. A DVD version of the film was released on 30 October 2001 by Hen's Tooth Video. In Australia there is a complete series DVD set of all the Dot films. They also were released on DVD on Digiview Entertainment. One of them is the first film which was released in 2005 by Digiview Productions and re-released in 2006 by Digiview Entertainment. It was then released by TUTM Home Entertainment on 1 November 2009, as the Digiview copies went out-of-print since Digiview's closure. The copyright for the film in the U.S. is unclear despite being released after the enactment of the Copyright Act of 1976. A Blu-ray release on July 2, 2013 by 20th Century Fox and Arrow Films.

The various films were shown on the Disney Channel in the late 1980s through the 1990s in the U.S., and on the Canadian Family Channel.

Sequels
Animation company Yoram Gross Studios followed up the first film with another eight movies between 1981 and 1994. The theme behind all of the films in the Dot series is the negative impact of humanity on animal life in nature. The sequels are as follows:
Around the World with Dot (1981)
Dot and the Bunny (1983)
Dot and the Koala (1985)
Dot and Keeto (1986)
Dot and the Whale (1986)
Dot and the Smugglers (1987)
Dot Goes to Hollywood (1987)
Dot in Space (1994; Australian release only)

Footnotes

External links

Dot and the Kangaroo at Oz Movies

1977 films
2002 films
1970s adventure films
1977 animated films
2002 animated films
Australian animated feature films
Australian children's films
1970s children's adventure films
Animated films based on children's books
Animated films based on Australian novels
Children's comedy-drama films
Films with live action and animation
1970s musical comedy films
Films directed by Yoram Gross
1977 comedy-drama films
Australian musical comedy-drama films
Australian children's adventure films
Australian independent films
1970s female buddy films
Animated buddy films
1970s musical drama films
1970s musical films
Animated films about kangaroos and wallabies
Animated films about koalas
Animated films about wombats
Films set in Australia
Films shot in Australia
1970s children's films
1970s children's animated films
1970s English-language films
Flying Bark Productions films